The Meldrim trestle disaster occurred at Meldrim, Georgia, on June 28, 1959. Involved was a Seaboard Air Line mixed freight train that derailed over the Ogeechee River. Loaded LPG tank cars from the train plunged into the river below and ruptured. The resulting BLEVE and fire killed 23 people--including entire families and a woman who was eight months pregnant--who were at the river that day as it was a popular area to swim and picnic at.

The derailment was caused by the movement of rails on the trestle, as they were compressed by the moving train.

An ICC investigation faulted the railroad for not installing guard rails along the trestle, which might have helped to keep the derailed equipment on the trestle deck, minimizing the risk of a hazardous materials release.

Killed were the following:
 Jimmy Anderson
 Elizabeth Dixon Barnes
 Ted Barnes
 Julian Beasley
 Linda Beasley
 Reba Lamb Beasley
 Michael Bland
 Charles Carpenter
 Billy Dent
 Joan Dent
 Frank Dixon
 Edna Dixon
 Barbara Hales
 Claudia Johnson
 L.B. Lamb
 Terry Lane
 Elbie Lane
 Florence Lane
 Leslie Lee
 James Smith
 Margie Hales Smith
 Timothy Smith
 Wayne Smith

References

External links
1959 Meldrim Trestle Disaster 50th Anniversary Video

Derailments in the United States
Bridge disasters in the United States
Bridge disasters caused by construction error
Accidents and incidents involving Seaboard Air Line Railroad
Railway accidents in 1959
Railway accidents and incidents in Georgia (U.S. state)
1959 in Georgia (U.S. state)
Effingham County, Georgia
June 1959 events in the United States
Construction accidents in the United States
1959 disasters in the United States